Timed out is a method of dismissal in the sport of cricket. It occurs when an incoming batsman is not ready to play within three minutes of the previous batsman being out. It is very rare to be out in such a fashion, and has never occurred in any international match.

Definition
Law 40 of the Laws of Cricket provides that an incoming batsman must be in position to take guard or for his partner to be ready to receive the next ball within three minutes of the fall of the previous wicket. If this requirement is not met, the incoming batsman will be given out, timed out, on appeal.

The "incoming batsman" may be any batsman who has not yet batted. There is no prescribed batting order in cricket. If no batsman has set foot on the field when the appeal is made, the batting captain may pick any player who has not yet batted as the one to be given out. As a result, if the next batsman was only slightly delayed, the captain would be expected to sacrifice his worst batsman—usually the No. 11.

If there is protracted delay in which no batsman comes to the wicket so that the umpires consider that the batting team is refusing to play, the umpires will award the match to the other team. If, however, no player comes to the wicket because all eligible players are unable to bat (e.g. through injury or illness) then they are not given out timed out; instead the innings is declared closed and "absent ill/injured/hurt" is noted next to those players' names as appropriate.

The rules of Twenty20 cricket stipulate that a batsman must be on the field within 90 seconds, rather than the three minutes specified in the Laws. As a result, rather than sitting in the pavilion, the batsman next in is positioned on a bench on the boundary, in a similar manner to some other team sports such as association football and rugby.

Unusual dismissal
The purpose of the law is to ensure there are no unnecessary delays to the game. It is easily avoided and it is very unusual for a batsman to get out 'timed out'. , there have been no instances of this type of dismissal in Test match or One Day International cricket and there have only been six instances in first-class cricket as a whole.

Batsmen dismissed 'timed out' in first-class cricket
 Andrew Jordaan – Eastern Province v Transvaal at Port Elizabeth in 1987–88 – Not out overnight, Jordaan was prevented from reaching the ground by flooded roads the following day.
 Hemulal Yadav – Tripura v Orissa at Cuttack in 1997–98 – Yadav was in conversation with his team manager on the boundary and did not attempt to reach the crease.
 Vasbert Drakes – Border v Free State at East London in 2002 – Drakes was still on his way to the match by aeroplane from his native West Indies when he was due to bat.
 AJ Harris – Nottinghamshire v Durham UCCE at Nottingham in 2003 – Harris was suffering from a groin strain and took too long to walk to the crease and was given out on appeal.
 Ryan Austin – Combined Campuses and Colleges v Windward Islands at Kingstown, St Vincent in 2013–14 – Austin, the number 11 batsman, failed to reach the crease in the requisite amount of time.
 Charles Kunje - Matabeleland Tuskers v Mountaineers at Bulawayo in 2017-18.

Test cricket
The third Test of the 2006–2007 series between India and South Africa was played at the Newlands Cricket Ground. In India's second innings, two batsmen were quickly dismissed. Sachin Tendulkar was listed as the fourth batsman. As he had been replaced as a fielder for eighteen minutes at the end of South Africa's innings, he was ineligible to bat in the India second innings until another eighteen minutes had expired from its commencement. After a six-minute delay, Sourav Ganguly came in as the next batsman. South African captain Graeme Smith did not appeal for a "timed out" dismissal of the incoming batsman.

History
"Timed Out" as a specific method of dismissal was added to the Laws in the 1980 code. It provided two minutes for the incoming batsman to "step on to the field of play". In the 2000 code, this was revised to three minutes for the batsman to "be in position to take guard or for his partner to be ready to receive the next ball". However, the first printed Laws of cricket, in 1775, already required the umpires "To allow Two Minutes for each Man to come in when one is out".

In 1919, Sussex cricketer Harold Heygate was given out by the umpire Alfred Street as "timed out" in a first-class County Championship match with Somerset at Taunton. MCC, then in charge of the Laws, later ruled that the umpire was correct in ending the Sussex innings when Heygate failed to appear within two minutes, but that the batsman should be marked as "absent", which is how it appears in the 1920 edition of Wisden Cricketers' Almanack. Under present rules, Heygate would have been recorded as "absent hurt", and this is how his innings is now recorded in CricketArchive. The match ended in a tie.

See also
 List of unusual dismissals in international cricket

Notes

References
Wisden Cricketers' Almanack
The official laws of cricket

External links

Cricket laws and regulations
Cricket terminology